Newark Valley may refer to:

 Newark Valley, New York, a town
 Newark Valley (village), New York, a village within the town
 Newark Valley Municipal Building and Tappan-Spaulding Memorial Library, a historic municipal building within the village
 Newark Valley (Nevada)
 Newark Valley, a single by Gary Wilson